Eric Kim (born 1977) is a Korean-Canadian comic book creator. He illustrated The Sidesteppers for Owl Magazine, has done freelance work for UDON Entertainment, illustrated Love as a Foreign Language for Oni Press, Degrassi Extra Credit #3: Missing You, as well as fantasy and role playing work.

Career
Kim created the webcomics Battle Academy, and Vulture Gulch with Jim Dougan (part of The Chemistry Set).

Kim's satirical adaptation of the full plays of William Shakespeare, The Complete Plays of William Shakespeare, in which Kim summarized each of Shakespeare's 36 plays with a two-panel, two-page spread, was published in 2010 by the Toronto-based Inkskratch Publishing.

Kim has worked with B. Clay Moore on Billy Smoke for Oni Press. He also worked on a webcomic called Streta, that was featured on Transmission X.

Kim provided extensive manga illustrations, including 21 interior pages for Red-Blooded Risk: The Secret History of Wall Street by Aaron Brown.

Personal life
Eric Kim lives in the greater Toronto area.

Bibliography
 Love as a Foreign Language Vol. 1 by J. Torres and Eric Kim - Oni Press, 
 Love as a Foreign Language Vol. 2 by J. Torres and Eric Kim - Oni Press, 
 Love as a Foreign Language Vol. 3 by J. Torres and Eric Kim - Oni Press, 
 Love as a Foreign Language Vol. 4 by J. Torres and Eric Kim - Oni Press, 
 Love as a Foreign Language Vol. 5 by J. Torres and Eric Kim - Oni Press, 
 Love as a Foreign Language Vol. 6 by J. Torres and Eric Kim - Oni Press, 
 Love as a Foreign Language Omnibus 1 by J. Torres and Eric Kim - Oni Press, 
 Love as a Foreign Language Omnibus 2 by J. Torres and Eric Kim - Oni Press, 
 Degrassi Extra Credit #3: Missing You by J. Torres and Eric Kim - Simon & Schuster, 
 Negative Burn #7 "Vulture Gulch" by Jim Dougan and Eric Kim
 The Sidesteppers'' by Eric Kim
 The Complete Plays of William Shakespeare by Eric Kim - Inkskratch Publishing,

References

External links

 
 Eric Kim at the Comic Book Database
 Battle Academy (defunct)
 Interview with cIndyCenter.com Podcast
 Streta (defunct)
 Facebook Fan Page
 McTank, a free comic on LINE Webtoon

Canadian comics writers
Canadian comics artists
Canadian webcomic creators
1977 births
Living people
Artists from Toronto
Writers from Toronto
Place of birth missing (living people)